Aechmea catendensis is a species of flowering plant in the genus Aechmea. This species is endemic to Brazil.

References

catendensis
Flora of Brazil